Franklin Goodman Sytner (born 29 June 1944 in Liverpool) is a British racing driver, a Life Member of the BRDC, and was the 1988 British Touring Car Champion, driving a BMW M3. He also won his class in 1990.

Racing career 

He started racing in the early 1970s in Formula Ford and later became known for racing in the Clubmans formula for front-engined sports cars, before moving into Touring Cars in the 1980s. As a successful BMW dealer with a chain of dealerships it was natural that he should gravitate towards their products, however he started his BTCC career driving for Tom Walkinshaw's TWR team, which was running the Rover SD1 Vitesse. However, Sytner and Walkinshaw fell out and Frank abruptly left the team halfway through his first season. Sytner joined the BMW team, fielding the 635 model run by Ted Grace Racing. It was Sytner who protested the legality of the TWR Rovers in 1983, an action which eventually cost Steve Soper the championship that season. Sytner entered a semi-works BMW 635 in 1984, running under the Sytner Racing banner and finished second in class to Andy Rouse.

Sytner took a year out in 1986, but returned in 1987, having joined Prodrive who had taken over the factory BMW contract, running the BMW M3. Success was immediate, with several wins, before taking the BTCC title outright in 1988. Sytner won his class, the new look 2.0 litre super touring formula, and came second overall in 1990, despite strong competition from 1989 champion John Cleland in the works Vauxhall Cavalier. The two even had a controversial collision at the Birmingham Superprix late in the season. Sytner's final season was 1991, which saw him retire from the sport at the end of the year to concentrate on his car dealership.

He moved into historic car racing in the 1990s, in both sports cars and historic Formula One cars - he is particularly known these days for his exploits in a Penske.

In 1997 Frank won the Ferrari Sportscar Pre-1959 class at the Historic Grand Prix of Monaco in a Ferrari 250. In 2002 he even managed to win the F1 Grand Prix pre-1966 race in a Brabham BT4 at the same event.

Business ventures 

Together with his brother Alan Sytner, who at one time owned the Cavern Club in Liverpool Frank founded his first car dealership in Nottingham in 1968, specialising in BMWs. Sytner BMW was the first dealership in the UK to market the Alpina brand when it was given an exclusive contract in the early 1980s. Throughout the 1990s, Sytner expanded his business through acquisitions and shrewd investments. He now owns around 45 dealerships in total, selling Jeep, Mercedes, Ferrari and Lotus among other prestige marques.

He underwent heart bypass surgery in May 2006.

Frank suffered a suspected heart attack while racing a Lola at the Donington Historic Festival on 30 April 2011.

Racing record

Complete British Saloon / Touring Car Championship results
(key) (Races in bold indicate pole position) (Races in italics indicate fastest lap – 1 point awarded ?–1989 in class)

 – Race was stopped due to heavy rain. No points were awarded.

† Events with 2 races staged for the different classes.

‡ Endurance driver.

References

1944 births
Living people
English racing drivers
British Touring Car Championship drivers
British Touring Car Championship Champions
Sportspeople from Liverpool
BMW M drivers